Godfrey Nash was a former Grand Prix motorcycle road racer. He competed from 1968 to 1971 in the Grand Prix world championships. His best season was in 1969 when he won the 500cc Yugoslavian Grand Prix, and finished the season in third place behind Giacomo Agostini and Gyula Marsovsky. With his victory on a Norton Manx at the 1969 Yugoslavian Grand Prix at the Opatija Circuit, he became the last rider to win a 500cc Grand Prix race on a single-cylinder machine.

References

Year of birth missing (living people)
Living people
English motorcycle racers
350cc World Championship riders
500cc World Championship riders
Place of birth missing (living people)